Rhys Williams (born 3 February 2001) is an English professional footballer who plays as a centre-back for Liverpool.

Early life
Williams was born in Preston, Lancashire.

Club career

Early career
Williams joined Liverpool's academy aged ten and won the FA Youth Cup with the their youth team in 2019. He joined Kidderminster Harriers on loan in August 2019.

In September 2020, Williams signed a long-term contract with Liverpool. He made his first-team debut for the club in the EFL Cup on 24 September 2020, against Lincoln City, partnering Virgil van Dijk in central defence. On 21 October 2020, Williams came on as a 90th-minute substitute against AFC Ajax in the UEFA Champions League. He made his second Champions League appearance the following week, where he came on as a 30th-minute substitute against FC Midtjylland after an injury to Fabinho. Liverpool went on to win 2–0, with Jürgen Klopp praising his performance after the game, saying to the press, "He did well, everything looks promising." On 4 November 2020, Williams played the full ninety minutes in a Champions League tie at Atalanta, keeping a clean sheet in a 5–0 win. On 16 December 2020, he made his Premier League debut with a start in a 2–1 win against Tottenham Hotspur. On 8 May, he slotted back alongside Nat Phillips in a 2–0 win over Southampton. He went on to play every game in the heart of the defence for Liverpool as they finished third.

Loans
On 31 August 2021, Williams signed a new contract with Liverpool and joined Swansea City on loan, initially to last until 30 June 2022, but Liverpool recalled him on 20 January 2022.

Williams's next loan move was to Blackpool, on 19 July 2022, for the duration of the 2022–23 season. He made his debut for the club in a single-goal victory over Reading at Bloomfield Road on 29 July. After 17 appearances with the Seasiders, Williams was recalled to Liverpool on 23 January 2023.

International career
Williams played for the England U18 team between March and May 2019, and was called up for the England U-19 team for the International Marbella Cup in October 2019.

On 5 October 2020, Williams received his first call-up to the England U-21 squad, and made his debut during a 3–3 draw against Andorra on 7 October 2020.

Career statistics

Honours
Liverpool Academy
FA Youth Cup: 2018–19

References

External links
Profile at the Liverpool F.C. website

2001 births
Living people
Footballers from Preston, Lancashire
English footballers
Association football defenders
Liverpool F.C. players
Kidderminster Harriers F.C. players
Swansea City A.F.C. players
Blackpool F.C. players
National League (English football) players
Premier League players
English Football League players
England youth international footballers
England under-21 international footballers